The 2022 Judo Oceania Open Perth was held at the Gold Netball Centre in Perth, Western Australia, from 29 to 30 October 2022 as part of the IJF World Tour and during the 2024 Summer Olympics qualification period. Like the 2019 Judo Oceania Open Perth before it, this "Continental Open" level event's rules were those of a Grand Prix level event, and it awarded ranking points as one.

Medal summary

Men's events

Women's events

Source Results

Medal table

References

External links
 
 

2022 IJF World Tour
2022 Judo Grand Prix
Sports competitions in Perth, Western Australia
Judo
Oceania Open 2022
Judo